Wild Geese Calling is a 1941 American drama film directed by John Brahm and starring Henry Fonda and Joan Bennett. It was distributed by 20th Century-Fox. The screenplay was written by Horace McCoy, based on a 1940 novel by Stewart Edward White. The music score is by Alfred Newman.

Plot
A lumberjack, John, travels to Alaska from Seattle in search of gold. He marries a dance-hall girl named Sally, but soon finds that she was once in love with his best friend, Blackie.

Cast
Henry Fonda as John Murdock
Joan Bennett as Sally Murdock
Warren William as Blackie Bedford
Ona Munson as Clarabella
Barton MacLane as Pirate Kelly
Russell Simpson as Marshal Len Baker
Iris Adrian as Mazie
James C. Morton as Mack
Paul Sutton as Manager
Mary Field as Jennie Delaney
Stanley Andrews as Delaney
Robert Emmett Keane as Ralph - Headwaiter
Adrian Morris as Stout Guide (as Michael Morris)
George Watts as Mush Mahoney
Charles Middleton as Doctor Jed Sloan
Richard Alexander as Alaskan (uncredited)

References

External links

 
Wild Geese Calling at Allmovie

1941 films
20th Century Fox films
American black-and-white films
Films scored by Alfred Newman
Films based on American novels
Films directed by John Brahm
Films set in Alaska
Films set in the 1890s
American historical drama films
1940s historical drama films
1940s English-language films
1940s American films